Nonsense Revolution is a 2008 Canadian Comedy drama written and directed by Ann Verrall, starring Alex House, Anastasia Phillips, Robert Clark and Deborah Allen.

Synopsis
Nonsense Revolution is about a group of friends who were partying one night. In a terrible accident, Kaz (Alex House), one of the group dies in a "hit and run" accident.

About a year later, Kaz returns with angel wings (but is not saintly at all). He "haunts" one of the friends called Tess (Anastasia Phillips) and appears only to her but remains invisible to all the others. He tells Tess to arrange the gathering of the group together on the anniversary of his death. An awkward atmosphere develops as Kaz "plays" around with the group sexually arousing them by touching them with his feathers and making them engage in various heterosexual and homosexual acts with each other.

Cast 
Alex House as Kaz
Anastasia Phillips as Tess
Robert Clark as Tom
Deborah Allen as Curtis' ancestor
Loretta Yu as Nora
Seamus Morrison as Logan
Gregory Penney as Curtis
Krista MacDonald as Police constable
Adrian Comeau as Bo
Shauna Bradley as Mia
Jordan Munn as Will Mac
Keelin Jack as Adriana
Michael McPhee as Jimmy
Todd Godin as Police constable
Curtis' ancestors played by
Heather Rankin
James Milligan
Michael Pellerin
Lisa Fennell
Novalea Buchan

Production
The film was shot in Halifax, Nova Scotia and the surrounding area making use of the tax credit scheme for shooting locally in place at the time.

See also 
 List of LGBT films directed by women

References

External links 
 
 Nonsense Revolution at www.shortworksproductions.ca

2008 films
2008 comedy films
English-language Canadian films
Canadian LGBT-related films
2008 LGBT-related films
2000s English-language films
2000s Canadian films